The Bonaire Federation of Labour (FEDEBON) is a trade union federation on the island of Bonaire in the Netherlands Antilles. It is affiliated with the International Trade Union Confederation.

References

Trade unions in Bonaire
International Trade Union Confederation

fr:Fédération bonairienne du travail